John Eyre Sloane (September 16, 1886 – July 17, 1970) was an American industrialist

He was born in South Orange, New Jersey, to well-known scientist, inventor and author, Dr. T. O'Conor Sloane. He established one of the country's first airplane manufacturing plants in Long Island City, Queens, New York City in 1912.

Biography
Sloane was born on September 16, 1886. He graduated from Columbia University in 1908. He established Sloane Manufacturing Co. in 1915, which was later reorganized into Standard Aircraft Corporation and sold to Mitsui & Co. He married Thomas Edison's daughter, Madeleine, and they had four children, Thomas Edison Sloane, John Edison Sloane, Michael Edison Sloane and Peter Edison Sloane. He died in 1970. He was the younger brother of photographer T. O'Conor Sloane Jr.

References

1886 births
1970 deaths
Edison family
People from South Orange, New Jersey
Businesspeople from New Jersey
American industrialists
Manufacturing company founders
Columbia University alumni
Aircraft designers